Shivshakti Sachdev (born 21 May 1993), is an Indian actress who mainly works in Hindi television. She made her acting debut in 2002 with Bhabhi portraying Mehak Thakral. She is best known for her portrayal of Bebo Narang Malhotra in Sabki Laadli Bebo, Priyanka Raj in Afsar Bitiya and Rani Uberoi in The Suite Life of Karan & Kabir.

Sachdev made her film debut with the Telugu film Amaram Akhilam Prema in 2020.

Early life
Sachdev was born on 21 May 1993 in New Delhi.

Career

She has starred in Indian TV serials such as Sabki Laadli Bebo, Afsar Bitiya, Break Time Masti Time, The Suite Life of Karan & Kabir and Diya Aur Baati Hum and more along with many Indian TVC. She also had played the role of Saloni in an episodic  show Gumrah - End Of Innocence. Her influences include Vidya Balan. In 2020, she acted in the Telugu film Amaram Akhilam Prema, her debut film.

Filmography

Films

Television

Awards and nominations

References

External links

Living people
Indian television actresses
Indian soap opera actresses
Actresses from Mumbai
People from Delhi
21st-century Indian actresses
1993 births